Sentinel High School is located in Missoula, Montana, United States. It is in the Missoula County Public Schools District No. 1. Sentinel has approximately 1,300 students, and a faculty of approximately 100. Sentinel was ranked sixth-best high school in the state of Montana, two spots behind the district's Hellgate. Big Sky and Seeley-Swan were unranked.

Programs
 Band and Jazz Band
 Choir
 Orchestra
 Drama

Clubs and Activities

 Amnesty International
 Art
 Bitterroot Yearbook
 DECA
 Design Studio
 Ecology Project International Club
 FIRST Robotics
 French Club
 Key Club
 Gay-Straight Alliance
 Konah (student newspaper)
 Kopee
 Model United Nations
 Native American
 National Honor Society
 Speech & Debate
 Student Government
 Thespians

Athletics

 Boys basketball
 Girls basketball
 Cheerleading
 Cross country
 Football
 Golf
 Boys soccer
 Girls soccer
 Softball
 Swimming
 Tennis
 Track
 Volleyball
 Wrestling

References

External links

High schools in Missoula, Montana
Public high schools in Montana